Shon J. Manasco (born May 17, 1970) is an American government official and businessman who served as the acting United States Under Secretary of the Air Force from December 27, 2019 to January 20, 2021. In April 2020, it was announced that President Donald Trump planned to ask the Senate to confirm him for this position. On December 30, 2020, the nomination was withdrawn, at his request.

Education 
Manasco earned a Bachelor of Science degree in systems engineering and management from the United States Military Academy and a Master of Business Administration from Southern Methodist University.

Career 
Manasco served as an officer in the United States Army, commanding at Fort Bragg before becoming director of finance and accounting for the Intelligence Support Activity. While in public service, he held numerous staff and leadership positions supporting worldwide operational activities for Joint Special Operations forces.

After leaving the Army, Manasco spent eleven years as a senior vice president at Bank of America, holding leadership roles in investment and retail banking, asset management and securities.  He was then recruited  to Baltimore, MD and worked as senior vice president and chief human resource officer for Constellation Energy Group, where he led corporate and shared services function, at the height of the financial crisis.

Manasco later worked as an executive vice president at USAA. During his tenure, Manasco led all sales and services at the company as the Executive Vice President, Member Experience and was the firm's Chief Administrative Officer, where his team was responsible for leading the association's business solutions, information technology and innovation labs, corporate services, enterprise cyber and physical security, procurement and USAA ventures.  He was recruited to the company as the Chief Human Resources Officer.

References

External links
 Biography at U.S. Air Force

1970 births
Living people
Southern Methodist University alumni
Trump administration personnel
United States Army officers
United States Military Academy alumni